Donald K. McKim (born 1950) is an American Presbyterian theologian and editor. He works as Academic and Reference Editor for Westminster John Knox Press.

McKim studied at Westminster College, Pittsburgh Theological Seminary, and the University of Pittsburgh. He has taught at Memphis Theological Seminary and the University of Dubuque Theological Seminary.

McKim is known for his 1979 book The Authority and Interpretation of the Bible: An Historical Approach. Co-authored with Jack B. Rogers, it was Eternity magazine's "Book of the Year" in 1980. In the book, Rogers and McKim argued that the Bible was infallible but not inerrant.

Donald Keith McKim was born in New Castle, Pennsylvania, on February 25, 1950, to Keith Beatty and Mary Alisan (Leslie) McKim.

Works
 Heinrich Bullinger: An Introduction to His Life and Theology (2022), Cascade Companions, co-authored by Jim West (biblical scholar).

References

1950 births
Living people
Presbyterian Church (USA) teaching elders
Westminster College (Pennsylvania) alumni
Pittsburgh Theological Seminary alumni
University of Pittsburgh alumni
Memphis Theological Seminary faculty